Dani Martín is a Spanish field hockey coach. At the 2012 Summer Olympics he coached the Spain men's national field hockey team.

References

Living people
Spanish field hockey coaches
Year of birth missing (living people)
Place of birth missing (living people)
Spanish Olympic coaches
21st-century Spanish people